John Grant (June 1, 1841 – December 12, 1919) was a Scottish-born merchant and political figure in British Columbia. He represented Cassiar from 1882 to 1890 and Victoria City from 1890 to 1894 in the Legislative Assembly of British Columbia.

He was born in Alford, the eldest son of John Grant, and was educated at Midmar in Aberdeenshire. Grant came to Ontario with his family in 1855. In 1862, he moved to British Columbia from Elora. Grant spent five or six years in the Cariboo District and at the mines on the Peace River. In 1876, he became part of a firm located in Cassiar. Grant was mayor of Victoria from 1888 to 1891. Grant also served as a justice of the peace and a government roads superintendent. Grant died at Victoria in 1919.

References 

1841 births
Independent MLAs in British Columbia
Mayors of Victoria, British Columbia
1919 deaths
Canadian justices of the peace